was a Japanese diplomat and politician who served as Prime Minister of Japan from 1936 to 1937. He was executed for war crimes committed during the Second Sino-Japanese War at the Tokyo Trials.

Early life

His father had been adopted into the Hirota family of stonemasons.

Tokubei married Take (タケ), a daughter of the president of a Japanese noodle company. On 14 February 1878, the couple had a son, whom Tokubei named . They later had three more chilren. Tokubei's name is engraved on the epigraph that recognized masons who contributed to the construction of a statue of Emperor Kameyama in Higashi kōen (東公園) in Fukuoka city.

Hirota's writing was recognized as good from a young age since the name plate of the torii gate of Suikyo Shrine was written by Hirota when he was 11.
After attending Shuyukan, he continued his education at Tokyo Imperial University and graduated with a law degree. One of his classmates was the postwar Prime Minister Shigeru Yoshida.

First diplomatic career
After graduation, Hirota entered the Ministry of Foreign Affairs to become a career diplomat, and he served in a number of overseas posts. In 1923, he became director of the Europe and America Department of the Foreign Ministry. After he was minister to the Netherlands, he was ambassador to the Soviet Union from 1928 to 1932.

In 1933, Hirota became Foreign Minister in the cabinet of Prime Minister Saitō Makoto, just after Japan had withdrawn from the League of Nations. He retained the position in the subsequent cabinet of Admiral Keisuke Okada.

As Foreign Minister, Hirota negotiated the purchase of the Chinese Eastern Railway in Manchuria from Soviet interests. He also promulgated the Hirota Sangensoku (the Three Principles by Hirota) on 28 October 1935 as the definitive statement of Japan's position towards China. The three principles were the establishment of a Japan–China–Manchukuo bloc, the organization of a Sino-Japanese common front against the spread of communism, and the suppression of anti-Japanese activities within China. Hirota argued that warlordism and Chinese Communism represented a "festering sore deep down in the bosom of Eastern Asia" that threatened "all Asian races with sure and inescapable death" and considered further military engagement in China to be "heroic surgery," rather than invasion.

Prime minister

In 1936, with the radical factions within the Japanese military discredited after the 26 February Incident, Hirota was selected to replace Okada as Prime Minister of Japan. Hirota placated the military by reinstating the system by which only active-duty Army or Navy officers could serve in the Cabinet posts of war minister or navy minister. The military had abused the system in the past to bring down civilian governments.

In terms of foreign policy, the Anti-Comintern Pact with Nazi Germany and Fascist Italy was signed during his premiership. The treaty was the predecessor to the Tripartite Pact of 1940.

Hirota's term lasted for slightly less than a year. He resigned after a disagreement with Hisaichi Terauchi, who was serving as the war minister, over a speech by the Rikken Seiyūkai representative Kunimatsu Hamada criticizing military interference in politics. Kazushige Ugaki was appointed as his successor but was unable to form the government because of army opposition. In February 1937, Senjūrō Hayashi was appointed to replace Hirota as prime minister.

Second diplomatic career
Hirota soon returned to government service as foreign minister under Hayashi's successor, Prince Konoe Fumimaro. During his second term as foreign minister, Hirota strongly opposed the military's aggression against China, which completely undermined his efforts to create a Japan-China-Manchukuo alliance against the Soviet Union. He also spoke out repeatedly against the escalation of the Second Sino-Japanese War. The military soon tired of his criticism and forced his retirement in 1938.

In 1945, however, Hirota returned to government service to lead Japanese peace negotiations with the Soviet Union. At the time, Japan and the Soviet Union were still under a non-aggression pact even though all other Allied Powers had declared war on Japan. Hirota attempted to persuade Joseph Stalin's government to stay out of the war, but the Soviet Union ultimately declared war on Japan in between the atomic bombings of Hiroshima and Nagasaki.

Postwar
Following Japan's surrender, Hirota was arrested as a Class A war criminal and brought before the International Military Tribunal for the Far East (IMTFE). He offered no defense and was found guilty of the following charges:
Count 1 (waging wars of aggression, and war or wars in violation of international law)
Count 27 (waging unprovoked war against the Republic of China)
Count 55 (disregard for duty to prevent breaches of the laws of war)

He was sentenced to death by hanging and was executed at Sugamo Prison. The severity of his sentence remains controversial, as Hirota was the only civilian executed as a result of the IMTFE proceedings. It is often stated that the main factor in his death sentence was the fact that he was party to information about what is now known as the Nanjing Massacre, which he allegedly telegraphed to the Japanese embassy in Washington, DC.

As foreign minister, Hirota had received regular reports from the War Ministry about the military's atrocities, such as the Nanjing Massacre, but lacked any authority over the offending military units themselves. Nonetheless, the tribunal condemned Hirota's failure to insist for the Japanese Cabinet act to put an end to the atrocities. Other possible factors in Hirota's sentence included his signing of the Tripartite Alliance and the antipathy of China's Kuomintang government towards the Hirota Sangensoku, which it viewed as providing justification for Japan's aggression against China in the Second Sino-Japanese War, which began during Hirota's second term as Foreign Minister.

Honours
Grand Cordon of the Order of the Sacred Treasure (1933)
Grand Cordon of the Order of the Rising Sun (1934)

Notes

Sources
 Frank, Richard B. Downfall: The End of the Imperial Japanese Empire. Penguin (Non-Classics); Reissue edition (2001). 
 Maga, Timothy P. Judgment at Tokyo: The Japanese War Crimes Trials. University of Kentucky (2001). 
 Minear, Richard H. Victors' Justice: The Tokyo War Crimes Trial. University of Michigan (2001). 
The Complete Transcripts of the Proceedings of the International Military Tribunal for the Far East, reprinted in R. John Pritchard and Sonia Magbanua Zaide (eds.), The Tokyo War Crimes Trial, vol. 20 (Garland Publishing: New York and London 1981)
 Toland, John. The Rising Sun: The Decline and Fall of the Japanese Empire, 1936–1945. Modern Library; Reprint edition (2003).

External links

Hirota's trial
 

|-

|-

1878 births
1948 deaths
20th-century prime ministers of Japan
People from Fukuoka
Prime Ministers of Japan
World War II political leaders
Executed prime ministers
University of Tokyo alumni
Japanese people convicted of the international crime of aggression
Japanese people convicted of crimes against humanity
People executed by the International Military Tribunal for the Far East
Members of the House of Peers (Japan)
People executed for crimes against humanity
Heads of government convicted of war crimes
Foreign ministers of Japan
Japanese politicians convicted of crimes
Heads of government who were later imprisoned
Ambassadors of Japan to the Soviet Union
Ambassadors of Japan to Germany